Qasr al-Hayr al-Gharbi is a Syrian desert castle or qasr located 80 km south-west of Palmyra on the Damascus road. The castle is a twin palace of Qasr al-Hayr al-Sharqi, built by the Umayyad caliph Hisham ibn Abd al-Malik in 727 CE. It was built in the  Umayyad  architectural style.

Description

Qasr al-Hayr al-Gharbi is one of a number of Umayyad desert castles in the Syrian/Jordanian region. The site originally consisted of a palace complex, a bath house, industrial buildings for the production of olive oil, an irrigated garden and another building which scholars suggest may have been a caravanserai. Over the entrance is an inscription which declares that it was built by Hisham in the year 727, a claim that is borne out by the architectural style.

It was used as an eye of the king during the Umayyad era, to control the movement of the desert tribes and to act as a barrier against marauding tribes, as well as serving a hunting lodge. It is one of the most luxurious examples of a desert palace. Later it was utilized by the Ayyubids and the Mamelukes but was abandoned permanently after the Mongol invasions.

The castle is quadrangular in outline with  sides. The central doorway to the castle is very attractive and has been moved to the National Museum of Damascus to be used as the entrance. Its semi-cylindrical towers on the sides of the doorway, columns, and the geometric shapes mirrored a blend of Persian, Byzantine and Arab architecture.

Little of the original castle remains; however, the reservoir to collect water from Harbaka dam, a bath and a khan are still visible. The gateway is preserved as a façade in the National Museum of Damascus.

See also
 Desert castles 
 Islamic art
 Islamic architecture
 List of castles in Syria
 Umayyad architecture

References

External links

8th-century fortifications
Umayyad palaces
Umayyad architecture in Syria
Umayyad architecture in Jordan
Castles in Syria
Buildings and structures in Homs Governorate
Palaces in Syria
8th-century establishments in the Umayyad Caliphate
Buildings and structures completed in 727